Canadian country music singer Dean Brody's discography consists of seven studio albums, 
one extended play, forty singles (including two as a featured artist), and thirty music videos.

Brody's self-titled debut album—released in 2009 under the independent label Broken Bow Records—debuted at number 187 on the US Billboard 200, and featured four singles, the most notable being "Brothers", which peaked at number 26 on the US Hot Country Songs Chart and number 76 on the Canadian Hot 100.

After signing with Open Road Recordings, Brody released five albums: Trail in Life, Dirt, Crop Circles, Gypsy Road, and Beautiful Freakshow. These albums have produced over twenty collective top-10 singles on Canadian country radio, including the number-one hits "Canadian Girls", "Bounty", and "8th Day". Twelve of his singles have been certified Gold by Music Canada, with eight (including "Bring Down the House") reaching Platinum status.

Upon launching his own independent label, Scurvy Dog Music, Brody has released the album Boys, and landed three consecutive Canadian country number-ones with "Can't Help Myself", "Canadian Summer", and "Boys". He has since achieved two more number-ones with "More Drinkin' Than Fishin'" and "Where'd You Learn How to Do That" after signing with Starseed Records.

Studio albums

2000s

2010s

2020s

Extended plays

Singles

2000s

2010s

2020s

Other singles

Promotional singles

Christmas singles

Guest singles

Music videos

Notes

References

Country music discographies
Discographies of Canadian artists